Nerunjipettai is a panchayat town in Anthiyur taluk of  Erode district in the Indian state of Tamil Nadu.

Demographics
 India census, Nerunjipettai had a population of 6372. Males constitute 52% of the population and females 48%. Nerunjipettai has an average literacy rate of 53%, lower than the national average of 59.5%: male literacy is 62%, and female literacy is 43%. In Nerunjipettai, 11% of the population is under 6 years of age.

References

Cities and towns in Erode district